Zelma is an unincorporated community in Pleasant Run Township, Lawrence County, Indiana.

History
Zelma was platted on May 23, 1890, by Stephen and James Fountain. Its name honors Zelma Fountain, daughter of a settler.

Geography

References

Unincorporated communities in Lawrence County, Indiana
Unincorporated communities in Indiana